Robert Andrew Naponic (born March 9, 1947) is a retired professional American football quarterback who played primarily for the Houston Oilers of the National Football League. 

His NFL career lasted but a single season, 1970, which was also the first of the Oilers' forty seasons in the NFL after the AFL–NFL merger.

Biography
Naponic played at the collegiate level at the University of Illinois. 

During his sole year with the Oilers, Naponic was third on the depth chart behind Charley Johnson and Jerry Rhome. Up until the final game for the 1970 season, he had thrown only one pass, for an incompletion in a 44–0 loss to the St. Louis Cardinals. His final game took place at the Cotton Bowl against the Dallas Cowboys. With injuries to Rhome and Johnson, Naponic took over the quarterback duties against the Doomsday Defense. He completed 6 of 19 passes for a net of 65 yards 52–10 Oiler loss.

Naponic's son, Jackson, later played football as a fullback at Texas Christian University while pursuing a finance degree.

References

External links

Living people
American football quarterbacks
Illinois Fighting Illini football players
Houston Oilers players
Players of American football from Pennsylvania
People from Greensburg, Pennsylvania
1947 births